Leaves from Australian Forests (1869) is the second collection of poems by Australian poet Henry Kendall. It was released in hardback by George Robertson in 1869, and features the poet's widely anthologised poems "Bell-Birds", "The Hut by the Black Swamp", and "The Last of His Tribe". It also contains the poet's works dedicated to the memories of fellow writer Charles Harpur and Daniel Henry Deniehy.

The collection includes 60 poems by the author that are reprinted from various sources.

Contents

Critical reception

On its original publication in Australia The Australasian stated that "...it is apparent that Kendall is as essentially Australian as Barns is Scotch or Bryant American. His soul has been nurtured amid the silent solemnity of the Australian bush, and his sweetest utterances are framed in giving voice to its solitudes.."

See also

 1869 in literature
 1869 in poetry

References

External Links

Poetry by Henry Kendall
Australian poetry collections
1869 books